Southern Utah University (SUU) is a public university in Cedar City, Utah. Founded in 1897 as a normal school, Southern Utah University now has over 1,800 graduates each year with baccalaureate and other graduate degrees from its six colleges. SUU offers more than 140 undergraduate and 19 graduate programs. More than 10,000 students attend SUU.

SUU's 17 athletic teams compete in Division I of the NCAA and are collectively known as the Thunderbirds. SUU joined the Western Athletic Conference in July 2022.

History

Branch Normal School 
 In the spring of 1897, Cedar City was notified it had been chosen as the site for the Branch Normal School, the first teaching training school in southern Utah. For the next three months, citizens labored to complete Ward Hall on Main Street for the first school year. In September, the school opened its doors.

School had been in session for two months when officials informed the school administrators that Ward Hall did not comply with state law and that a new building needed to be built on land deeded solely to the state by the next September or the school would be lost.

Cedar City residents came together and on January 5, 1898, a group of residents trudged into the Cedar Mountains through shoulder deep snow. It took them four days to reach the sawmills, located near present-day Brian Head Ski Resort. Upon arrival, they realized the wagons they had brought with them could not carry logs through the heavy snow. Sleighs were needed.

The way back was just as hard as the trip up. The snow continued to fall, destroying the trail they originally took. It was in this phase of their march that an old sorrel horse proved valuable. Placed at the front of the party, the horse would walk into the drifts, pushing against the snow until it gave way. Then he would pause for a rest and then get up and start over again. “Old Sorrel” was credited with being the savior of the expedition.

From January through July they continued their labors and when September 1898 arrived, Old Main was almost completed. It had a large chapel for religious assemblies, a library and reading room, a natural history museum, biological and physical laboratories, classrooms, and offices.

Milton Bennion was first principal for the Branch Normal School. Bennion brought a code of integrity to the students of BNS. He established a self-governing student body. Bennion directed 161 students during his time as principal.

The BNS started classes with four teachers, now known as the Founding Four. Bennion, who acted as principal, taught history, geography, and physiology classes during his three-year tenure before he left in 1900 to teach at the University of Utah. Howard R. Driggs acted as the first English professor at BNS until 1905. During his career, Driggs was both a professor of English education and a historian of the American West. SUU still honors his name with the Howard R. Driggs Collection located in the Gerald R. Sherratt Library and plays host to semi-annual lectures by national scholars. The third, George W. Decker, was a southern Utah native and was adamant about teaching from the student's point of view rather from a book. Students loved him so much that a request by the student body to proper authorities was the turning point leading to his appointment as the fourth principal of BNS. Annie Elizabeth Spencer Milne was also on the original BNS staff. She taught physical education and started the school's first basketball team.

Under the leadership of Nathan T. Porter, the Science Building was constructed in 1901—now known as the Braithwaite Building — which doubled as classroom space. Interested in the arts, Porter enhanced student theatrical production and started the school's ballroom dance program.

Porter remained BNS principal until 1904, when George W. Decker took the position. Decker was among the first four faculty members at BNS and also the first southern Utah native to take the position. He served the school for 16 years, seven on the faculty and nine as principal before he was elected to the office of state representative.

Branch Agriculture College
Roy F. Homer became principal in 1913 and ushered BNS into the next stage as the Branch Agricultural College (BAC). BAC was a branch school of the Utah State Agriculture College (now Utah State University). BAC received its third building in 1927 as the Women's Gymnasium—now known as the Hunter Conference Center. It was then that ties were created between the school and Zion National Park that are still intact, raising the quality of classes, increasing enrollment, and creating the school's first Greek societies.

The school continued to expand under the leadership of Henry Oberhansley and H. Wayne Driggs. Driggs oversaw the building of the Football Field Stadium in 1947 and the reconstruction of Old Main after it caught fire. Driggs also established a campus ROTC program for returning soldiers and expanded studies to a four-year program.

College of Southern Utah
In 1951, Daryl Chase became president and was responsible for the schools heightened vision and name change to the College of Southern Utah (CSU). The next college president was Royden C. Braithwaite, who took office in 1955. During his tenure, CSU campus almost doubled in acreage. Of the 28 structures on campus at the time of his death in 1991, very few had not been built or renovated under his direction. He oversaw the construction of the Library (now the Auditorium) in 1955, Science Building (now the General Classroom Building) in 1961, the Music Center in 1967, and an additional Library (now the Electronic Learning Center) in 1969.

A monumental addition to the College of Southern Utah was the birth of the Utah Shakespeare Festival in 1961 by Fred C. Adams. In its first season it attracted 3,276 visitors and in 2012 it reached 130,000.

Southern Utah State College
In 1969, Braithwaite oversaw the school's name change to Southern Utah State College. He also coined the school's motto “Learning Lives Forever” and student enrollment grew from 360 to 2000. Orville D. Carnahan took over in 1978; during his three-year tenure he led the institution in an expansion of academic offerings.

The largest expansion of growth happened under the direction of Gerald R. Sherratt who was president from 1982 until 1997. During his time he oversaw the creation of the Business Building in 1982 and the Centrum in 1985.

Southern Utah University
 Southern Utah State College was given university status in 1991 under the direction of President Sherratt. Upon reaching university status, Sherratt was able to receive funding to construct 14 other buildings during his tenure. Sherratt also helped with the launching of the Utah Summer Games and the athletic program achieving NCAA Division I status.

Steven D. Bennion, grandson of Milt, and built a teacher-education facility, and added two new colleges and several new baccalaureate and graduate programs.

Michael T. Benson became president in 2007. Benson received his master's degree from Notre Dame and his doctorate from University of Oxford. During his time as president, he championed the most ambitious fundraising campaign in SUU history, raising more than $90 million of the $100 million goal, including the three largest donations in SUU history. He also oversaw the construction of the new Science Center, Cedar Hall, and the Carter Carillon. President Benson heightened academic standards and increased resources for instruction, significantly raised retention rates, and realigned SUU Athletics in the Big Sky Conference.

President Benson concluded his tenure at SUU and Scott L. Wyatt succeeded him in November 2013. Between 2013 and 2014 Wyatt finalized an unprecedented funding campaign, ending in the groundbreaking of the Beverly Taylor Sorensen Center for the Arts in March 2014. He would also go on to launch a 3-year bachelor's degree program in 2020. In March of 2020, during the COVID-19 pandemic, SUU shifted almost completely to remote learning for the remainder of the fall and summer 2020 semesters along with the other public universities in Utah. After Wyatt accepted a position in the Utah System of Higher Education Office of the Commissioner, Mindy Benson was named interim president in August 2021. Benson went on to be named the 17th president, the institution's first female president.

Administration
Since 1969, three administrative bodies have governed SUU: the President's Council, the Board of Trustees, and ultimately the Utah Boards of Regents. The President's Council consists of eight top SUU administrators. These groups convene regularly to discuss issues of top importance to the University and help advise the president on executive decisions. The Board of Trustees, created by the Higher Education Act of 1969, is an integral part of the Utah System of Higher Education. The Board of Trustees help facilitate communication between the institution and community, strengthen alumni traditions and goals, select recipient of honorary degrees, and implement and execute fundraising and developmental projects. The Utah Board of Regents is composed of 20 Utah residents, appointed by the governor for six-year terms, and oversees all institutes of higher education in the state of Utah.

Academics
In May 2013, SUU had 8,000 students and 261 full-time faculty members, and another 102 adjunct faculty to give a student/faculty ratio of 20:1. SUU admitted 57.3 percent of freshmen that applied, making a total of 1,264 new freshmen in September 2012 boasted an average GPA of 3.5 and an average composite ACT score of 22.95. SUU currently boasts a 53 percent graduation rate.

The University awards associates, bachelor's and master's degrees that are divided into four colleges and two schools. A combined total of 140 bachelor's degrees are offered along with 19 master's degrees. The University also offers a Doctorate of Clinical Psychology (Psy.D.) which is focused on clinical practices rather than research.

Rankings
In July 2012 the Council of Public Liberal Arts Colleges recognized SUU, one of only 27 universities in the U.S., as a designated public liberal arts and sciences university.

Performing and visual arts
SUU has a large number of performing and visual arts opportunities for students and the local community. Students perform more than 250 performances each year and vocal students have won many competitions of the National Opera Association and the National Association of Teachers of Singers.

The Department of Music is accredited by the National Association of Schools of Music and offers SUU students a wide array of musical opportunities. The Department of Theatre Arts and Dance offers two types of degrees and is closely connected with the Utah Shakespeare Festival, which is housed at SUU.

Student life

The Michael O. Leavitt Center for Politics and Public Service, named after Michael O. Leavitt, is housed at the university.

There are three student-run media outlets at SUU: the monthly campus newspaper, University Journal; KSUU 91.1 FM (Thunder 91), an FM radio station; and SUTV-9 cable television.

Utah Shakespeare Festival

The Shakespeare Festival, which is housed on SUU's campus, was founded by Fred C. Adams in 1961 and presented its first season in 1962, bringing in 3,276 spectators. The initial two-week season yielded $2,000 and demonstrated the cooperative relationship between SUU and the community. In 2003, nearly 150,000 ticket-holders viewed 246 performances in three theaters during a sixteen-week season. The Festival is now a year-round operation with a full-time staff of 26 and now an outgoing educational outreach program, including workshops and a touring version of one of the plays.

The Festival's well-known outdoor theatre materialized in stages. The Adams Memorial Shakespearean Theatre, located on SUU's campus and one of the most authentic Elizabethan theaters in the world, was dedicated in 1977. The Festival continued to grow and opened the modern indoor Randall L. Jones Theatre on June 23, 1989, offering classics of world drama. The Festival's repertoire spans more than three centuries of playwrights and has included classics of France, England, Norway, and the U.S. In 2015, the Utah Shakespeare Festival completed its last season in the Adams Shakespearean Theater. In 2016, the new Engelstad Shakespeare Theatre and the Eileen and Allan Anes Studio Theatre were added to Festival's facilities as part of the Beverley Taylor Sorenson Center for the Arts at Southern Utah University.

Utah Summer Games
In 1986, President Gerald R. Sherratt was inspired by the 1984 Summer Olympics in Los Angeles and, with the help of the local community, the first Utah Summer Games commenced. After more than 25 years, the Utah Summer Games brings in more than 10,000 athletes as young as three from the surrounding region in nearly 40 different Olympic-style competitions.Competitions include volleyball, water polo, tennis, archery, gymnastics, and basketball.

Intramural sports
Intramural sports are a large aspect of student life for Thunderbirds. More than 3,300 students participate each year. From badminton to pickleball to rugby, students have a long list of intramural sports to choose from that run the entire school year, with tournaments and events for each sport.

Outdoor recreation
With 13 national and state parks near SUU's campus outdoor recreation is a popular student activity, with many participating in rock climbing, hiking, backpacking, camping, mountain biking and boating in the surrounding red cliffs. SUU is a 60-minute drive from Zion National Park, 90-minute drive from Bryce Canyon National Park and only a 30-minute drive to Kolob Canyons.

Greek life
SUU is home to four Greek-letter organizations: Alpha Phi (sorority), Delta Psi Omega (sorority), Sigma Chi (fraternity), and Chi Phi (fraternity). Every year Greek students provide hundreds of hours of community service, raise thousands of dollars for charities and build leadership skills. Greek students also tap into a network of chapters around the world and build connections with Greek alumni such as former Utah Governor Jon Huntsman (Sigma Chi), award-winning actress Kimberly Williams-Paisley (Alpha Phi), renowned news anchor Walter Cronkite (Chi Phi).

Athletics

Southern Utah Thunderbirds have a rich history of competing against college teams throughout the country and in the State of Utah. Teams compete in the Western Athletic Conference with football in the NCAA Football Championship Subdivision (FCS, formerly known as Division I-AA). When the Thunderbirds entered the Big Sky Conference in 2012 they discontinued baseball and established men's and women's tennis in its place. In the summer of 2020, SUU discontinued tennis. The SUU gymnastics team competes within the Mountain Rim Gymnastics Conference (MRGC). The Thunderbirds currently have fifteen athletic programs.

The Thunderbirds compete in:

Football
Gymnastics
Basketball
Cross Country
Golf
Soccer
Softball
Track and Field
Volleyball

Notable alumni
Ricardo Dominguez, Electronic Disturbance Theater, University of California, San Diego
Harry Reid, U.S. Senate Majority Leader (2007–2015)
David C. Houle, National Coaches Hall of Fame, US record 68 State championships at Mountain View High School.
Michael O. Leavitt, 14th Governor of Utah and Secretary of Health and Human Services in the George W. Bush cabinet.
Jill Stevens, Miss SUU 2006, Miss Davis County 2007, Miss Utah 2007, Miss America 2008 "People's Choice" semifinalist.
Nick Miller, NFL wide receiver for the Oakland Raiders, SUU wide receiver from 2007 to 2008. 2008 Great West Special Teams Player of the Year.
DeWayne Lewis, NFL cornerback, Lewis was a 2 Time Conference Athlete of the Year.
Lonnie Mayne, Professional wrestler in the 1960s and 1970s. NWA United States Heavyweight Champion.
Cameron Levins, 2012 NCAA Track and Field Champion in the 5 and 10k, 2012 and 2020 Olympian, and 2012 Bowerman Award Winner.
Sean O'Connell, professional Mixed Martial Artist
Tysson Poots, 2012 Arena League Rookie of the year with 109 Receptions 1,183 Yards, and 30 Touchdowns for the Utah Blaze. Currently a member of the Arizona Rattlers.
Keala Settle, Broadway performer and Tony Award nominee, featured role in the major motion picture The Greatest Showman.
Brad Sorensen, 2012 and 2013 Payton Award finalist, threw 3,139 yards and 23 TDs in 2012, drafted in 2013 to the San Diego Chargers
James Cowser, a former NFL defensive end for the Oakland Raiders. All-time career FCS leader in sacks.
Miles Killebrew, NFL safety drafted by the Detroit Lions in the fourth round of the 2016 NFL Draft.
LeShaun Sims, NFL defensive back drafted by the Tennessee Titans in the fifth round of the 2016 NFL Draft.
Peter M. Johnson, First African-American general authority and current member of the first quorum of the seventy for the Church of Jesus Christ of Latter-day Saints.
Christopher Dorner, a Los Angeles police officer who committed a series of shootings in Southern California in February 2013

Notes

References

External links

 
Southern Utah University athletics website

 
Universities and colleges accredited by the Northwest Commission on Colleges and Universities
Tourist attractions in Iron County, Utah
Education in Iron County, Utah
Cedar City, Utah
1897 establishments in Utah
Public universities and colleges in Utah
Public liberal arts colleges in the United States